North Macedonia competed at the 2004 Summer Olympics in Athens, Greece, from 13 to 29 August 2004. This was the nation's third consecutive appearance at the Summer Olympics in the post-Yugoslav era.

The Olympic Committee of North Macedonia selected a team of ten athletes, seven men and three women, to compete in five different sports at these Olympic Games. Seven of them had previously competed in Sydney, including slalom kayaker Lazar Popovski, who became the first Macedonian athlete to compete in four editions of the Olympic Games (although he first appeared in 1992 as part of the Independent Olympic Participants), and freestyle wrestler Mogamed Ibragimov, who won the bronze in the men's 84 kg class. Former basketball player, 1976 Olympic silver medalist, and assistant coach Blagoja Georgievski was appointed by the committee to carry the Macedonian flag in the opening ceremony.

North Macedonia left Athens without receiving a single Olympic medal for the first time since the nation made its Olympic debut at the 1996 Summer Olympics in Atlanta.

Athletics

Athletes of North Macedonia have so far achieved qualifying standards in the following athletics events (up to a maximum of 3 athletes in each event at the 'A' Standard, and 1 at the 'B' Standard).

 Key
 Note – Ranks given for track events are within the athlete's heat only
 Q = Qualified for the next round
 q = Qualified for the next round as a fastest loser or, in field events, by position without achieving the qualifying target
 NR = National record
 N/A = Round not applicable for the event
 Bye = Athlete not required to compete in round

Men

Women

Canoeing

Slalom

Shooting

One Macedonian shooter qualified to compete in the following events:

Women

Swimming

Macedonian swimmers earned qualifying standards in the following events (up to a maximum of 2 swimmers in each event at the A-standard time, and 1 at the B-standard time):

Men

Women

Wrestling 

 Key
  – Victory by Fall.
  - Decision by Points - the loser with technical points.
  - Decision by Points - the loser without technical points.

Men's freestyle

See also
 Macedonia at the 2004 Summer Paralympics

References

External links
Official Report of the XXVIII Olympiad
Macedonian Olympic Committee 

Nations at the 2004 Summer Olympics
2004
Summer Olympics